Swimming at the 1991 European Youth Olympic Days was held in Brussels, Belgium.

Medal summary

Events

Boys' events

Girls' events

References

1991 European Youth Olympic Days
1991 in swimming
1991